WKLQ (94.5 FM, "The Q 94.5") is a radio station licensed to Holland, Michigan. Owned by Cumulus Media, the station broadcasts an adult album alternative format serving the Grand Rapids, Michigan market.

History
Prior to the country music format, 94.5 was occupied by WKLQ, with a Top 40/CHR format as "Hit Rock! The FM 94 KLQ" that started in 1984. But by the early 1990s, the station flipped formats to an active rock format. In 1996, the station added Howard Stern to the morning lineup. By 1999, the station had tweaked into Alternative and became known as The Rock@94.5 KLQ. After a few years of struggling with the rock format, the station flipped to WTNR and country on October 11, 2004 as 94.5 The New Thunder Country, later branded as Thunder 94-5.

On October 27, 2011, WTNR completely revamped the station's playlist by adding gold tracks not previously played on the station. These included songs by artists from the 1990s and early 2000s like Garth Brooks, Shania Twain, Brooks & Dunn, Alan Jackson among others.

On February 3, 2014, the station rebranded under Cumulus's Nash FM brand.

On January 4, 2019, WTNR returned to the Thunder branding, and added a simulcast on 107.3 WBBL-FM to replace its sports talk format, with both stations branding as Thunder 94.5 & 107.3.

The simulcast would be short-lived; on January 19, 2019, WTNR dropped Thunder and flipped to adult album alternative as The Q 94.5. The WKLQ calls (warehoused by a co-owned AM talk radio operation in Whitehall, MI) were reinstated on February 6, 2019 to match the new branding.

References

Michiguide.com - WTNR History

External links

KLQ (FM)
Adult album alternative radio stations in the United States
Holland, Michigan
Cumulus Media radio stations
Radio stations established in 1961
1961 establishments in Michigan